is a Japanese manga written and illustrated by Rin Tanaka. It was published by Ohzora Publishing in Japan in December 2007, and released by Aurora Publishing in English in November 2008.

Reception
Johanna Draper Carlson described the title story as "horrible".  Katherine Dacey felt the stories following the pianist couple were formulaic and lacked dramatic tension due to this.  Amy Grocki recommended it for readers looking for something more mature than shōjo manga.

References

External links

Aurora Publishing (United States)
Josei manga
2007 manga
Romance anime and manga
Ohzora Publishing manga